Unity is an unincorporated community in Lane County in the U.S. state of Oregon. It lies long Fall Creek just below Fall Creek Reservoir, north of Lowell and southeast of Springfield and Eugene.

Unity Bridge, a covered bridge which carries Lowell–Unity Road (Lowell–Jasper Road), crosses the creek at Unity. Unity Park, a county park also known as Fall Creek Park, is  beyond the bridge and downstream.

References

Unincorporated communities in Lane County, Oregon
Unincorporated communities in Oregon